Die Wannseekonferenz may refer to:
 The Wannsee Conference (film), a 1984 German TV film
 Die Wannseekonferenz (2022 film), a German TV docudrama

See also
 Wannsee Conference